Islands of Danger, also called Rescue, is a game by Richard Carr in which the object is to pilot a hovercraft through seven islands, destroying missile launchers protected by walls. The game is rather memorable for its music and its computer-generated islands made up of open fields, mountain chains, and dense forests. The craft moves at one-fourth speed across swamps (the purple areas).

Islands of Danger was followed by a sequel, Islands of Courage. According to the acknowledgements encoded into the game, Carr spent several months writing these games while he and his wife lived off of their savings.

References
Islands of Danger.

1990 video games
DOS games
DOS-only games
Vehicle simulation games
Video games developed in the United States